Mississippi Highway 313 (MS 313) is a minor state highway in Marshall County, Mississippi, serving the communities of Atway and Hudsonville.

Route description
MS 313 begins at an intersection with Holland Road/Old Hudsonville Road in the community of Hudsonville. Past this intersection, the road continues on as Old Hudsonville Road. The highway enters a long left curve for a tenth of a mile and intercepts Jackson Road. The road crosses the Mississippi Central Railroad and leaves Hudsonville. MS 313 heads west through rural areas for a mile before ending at MS 7. This portion is unsigned and is not maintained by the state.

Major intersections

References

External links

313
Transportation in Marshall County, Mississippi